Central Trust Bank Building is a historic bank building located in downtown Rochester, Monroe County, New York.  It was built in 1959, and is a five-story, International Style building with a flat roof.  It features a continuous metal and glass curtain wall on the south facade.  Originally three-stories, two additional stories were added in 1964. In 1968, a two-story addition along with a sheltered drive-up banking window were added.

It was listed on the National Register of Historic Places in 2012.

References

Bank buildings on the National Register of Historic Places in New York (state)
International style architecture in New York (state)
Office buildings completed in 1959
Commercial buildings  in Rochester, New York
National Register of Historic Places in Rochester, New York